Chloroclystis rubicunda is a moth in the family Geometridae. It is endemic to Fiji.

References

External links

Moths described in 1934
rubicunda
Endemic fauna of Fiji
Moths of Fiji